The 2020–21 LEB Plata season was the 21st season of the Spanish basketball third league. It started on 10 October 2020 with the first round of the regular season and ended on 29 May 2021 with the promotion playoffs.

It was the following season after the 2019–20 season was curtailed in response to the COVID-19 pandemic. Consequently, there were not relegations to Liga EBA and the league was expanded to 28 teams, record of the league, for this season.

Format changes
For this season, the league was expanded to 28 teams divided in two groups of 14 with only one group phase. At the end of the regular season, the top team of each group played for promote directly to LEB Oro, while the loser team will beas dropped to the quarter-finals of the promotion playoffs; the teams that finish in 2nd to 8th place of each group qualified for the promotion playoffs; the teams that finish in 11th and 12th place of each group played the relegation playoffs; and the last two teams of each group were relegated to Liga EBA.

Teams

Promotion and relegation (pre-season)
A total of 28 teams contested the league, including 21 sides from the 2019–20 season and seven promoted from the 2019–20 Liga EBA.

Teams promoted from Liga EBA
Aquimisa Carbajosa
Mondragón Unibersitatea (could not promote and finally registered in Liga EBA)
NCS Alcobendas
Ibersol CB Tarragona
Melilla Sport Capital Enrique Soler
Hozono Global Jairis
Zentro Basket Madrid (achieved a vacant berth)
CB Cornellà (achieved a vacant berth)

Venues and locations

Regular season

Group East

League table

Positions by round
The table lists the positions of teams after completion of each round. In order to preserve chronological evolvements, any postponed matches are not included in the round at which they are originally scheduled, but added to the full round they are played immediately afterwards.

Results

Group West

League table

Positions by round
The table lists the positions of teams after completion of each round. In order to preserve chronological evolvements, any postponed matches are not included in the round at which they are originally scheduled, but added to the full round they are played immediately afterwards.

Results

Playoffs

Group champions' playoffs

|}
Source: FEB

Promotion playoffs

Round of 16

|}
Source: FEB

Quarter-finals

|}
Source: FEB

Semi-finals

|}
Source: FEB

Relegation playoffs

|}
Source: FEB

Copa LEB Plata
The Copa LEB Plata was played on 30 January 2021, by the top team of each group after the end of the first half of the season (round 13).

Teams qualified

Game

Final standings

Awards 
All official awards of the 2020–21 LEB Plata season.

Group champions' playoffs MVP

Source:

Copa LEB Plata MVP

Source:

Player of the round

Regular season

References

External links
 Official website 

LEB2
LEB Plata seasons